Ben Voss (born 3 May 1973) is a South African comedian, actor and satirist. He has been a professional actor, playwright and producer since 1998 and is best known for his portrayal of fictional character, Beauty Ramapelepele, his comedy Sketch shows and performances in Pantomime. He has also starred in films alongside the likes of John Cleese and Troye Sivan. He has starred in the TV series Desert Rose due for release on Mnet and Showmax in 2022.

Formative Years
He was born in Rhodesia and educated at Uthongathi School, Natal, South Africa, where he matriculated in 1990. He then went on to complete an honours degree in Mechanical Engineering at the then University of Natal. He followed that with a post-graduate degree in Human Resources at the same institution. After a gap year in South East Asia he returned to Durban, South Africa to take up a post as an engineer in the paper industry.

Performing Arts Career
Voss became disillusioned with his engineering career and, in January 1997, he started a career in acting despite no formal training in the performing arts.

In addition to Voss's contributions to the South African comedy circuit, he is also an accomplished actor and script-writer with particular accolades for his performances in Shakespeare's Twelfth Night in 2001 and the title role in Macbeth in 2002. He is also multiple Naledi Award and Fleur du Cap winner and nominee.

Stage

On stage Voss is a satirist. He set up the production company, Mamba Productions and together with John van de Ruit (of Spud fame), produced and performed the comedy skit shows Green Mamba and Black Mamba. Both won many of South Africa’s major comedy and theatre awards and played in South Africa, Zimbabwe, Namibia, Botswana, Swaziland, Germany and the United Kingdom, with acclaimed runs at the Wimbledon Theatre in London.

Voss is arguably best known for his portrayal of the fictional South African business woman, Beauty Ramapelepele. Voss uses the alter-ego of Ramapelepele to deliver satirical social commentary on life in post-apartheid South Africa. His shows, Beauty and the B.E.E. and Bend it like Beauty (commissioned by the Oval House Theatre in London) have played in South Africa and abroad. His run at the Oval house theatre in London was featured on BBC world news and he was commissioned to perform at events in honour of the South African Soccer World Cup. Voss has also shared the stage with Pieter-Dirk Uys's "Evita" on his DVD release of Elections and Erections.

His latest one man show Benny Bushwhacker played over 100 shows throughout southern Africa. In 2018 he played the Evil Queen in the pantomime stage show of Snow White, directed by internationally acclaimed director Janice Honeyman at the Joberg theatre. In 2021 he was top billed, as one of the ugly sisters, alongside Desmond Dube in Janice Honeyman’s latest spectacular, Cinderella.

FILM

Voss’s film credits include the Spud series of movies where Voss plays Mr Lily, Spud's art teacher and under-14D/E rugby coach alongside Troye Sivan and John Cleese.

He also Played the lead in Robert Fraser’s Game and the supporting lead in Craig Friemond’s acclaimed drama Beyond the River in 2017.

TELEVISION

In 2021, Voss turned his attention to television and played a lead role in the MNET and Showmax production of Dessert Rose which is due for international release in 63 countries in early 2022.

Awards 
Naledi Award – Best comedic performance

Naledi Award – Best South African Script.

FNB Vita award – Best Supporting actor

FNB Vita award – Best Actor

Fleur du Cap award – Best Actor

3 Ovation Awards – National arts festival

References

External links
 Interview with John van de Ruit and Ben Voss about the comedy 'Green Mamba'
 Ben Voss's website
 Mamba Productions website

Living people
1974 births
University of Natal alumni
South African dramatists and playwrights
South African male comedians
White South African people
South African drag queens
South African male actors
Actors from Durban
Writers from Durban
21st-century South African LGBT people